The 2019 Richmond Spiders football team represented the University of Richmond in the 2019 NCAA Division I FCS football season. They were led by third-year head coach Russ Huesman and played their home games at E. Claiborne Robins Stadium. The Spiders were a member of the Colonial Athletic Association. They finished the season 5–7, 4–4 in CAA play to finish in a four-way tie for fifth place.

Previous season

The Spiders finished the 2018 season 4–7, 2–6 in CAA play to finish in a tie for tenth place.

Preseason

CAA poll
In the CAA preseason poll released on July 23, 2019, the Spiders were predicted to finish in tenth place.

Preseason All-CAA team
Senior defensive lineman Maurice Jackson was named preseason defensive player of the year for the CAA and to the preseason all-conference team. Safety Daniel Jones was named honorable mention for the all-conference team.

Schedule

Source:

Game summaries

Jacksonville

at Boston College

Elon

at Fordham

Albany

at Maine

Yale

at Delaware

Stony Brook

at Villanova

at James Madison

William & Mary

References

Richmond
Richmond Spiders football seasons
Richmond Spiders football